Stash Records was an American independent jazz record label based in New York City that flourished from 1975 through the late 1990s.  Its name was drawn from the subject of its first album, Reefer Songs (1976). Bernie Brightman (né Bernard Benjamin Brightman; 1921–2003) founded the label in 1975, structured it as a New York entity May 4, 1977 – Stash Records, Inc. – and operated it about until 1998.  The corporation dissolved March 28, 2001.

History

Pre-Stash Records
Before founding Stash Records, Bernard Brightman worked with his father's company, Brightman Products Co., Inc., maker Britemode "petites" and other ladies handbags and accessories – headquartered at 385 Fifth Avenue (at 36th Street, southeast corner) (1955) and 393 Fifth Avenue (1961), with showrooms in Chicago, Dallas, Los Angeles, Miami, and Pittsburgh.  Bernard's father, Max Brightman (1896–1962), founded and headed Brightman Products.  When Max died in 1962, Bernard, his mother (Max's wife), Anna Brightman (née Latter; 1892–1896), and Bernard's two siblings, Abraham (1918–2002) and Sylvia (subsequent surnames – Mazer, then Lubars; 1916–1885), helped sustain the firm for almost a decade.  They sold the firm in the early 1970s.

Stash Records
After the family business was sold, Bernard Brightman founded Stash Records in 1975.  Initially located in Brooklyn, Stash moved to 611 Broadway, Suite 411, New York City, then to 140 West 22nd Street, 12th floor, New York City.  Founded as an independent jazz label – focused on non-commercial vintage jazz and blues. From the strength of profits from its early releases, particularly the album Reefer Songs, Stash evolved into a record producer of jazz artists, including Hank Jones, Bucky and John Pizzarelli, Hilton Ruiz, Louis Bellson, Branford Marsalis, David Murray, Doc Cheatham, Buck Clayton, Helen Forrest, Chris Connor, Mel Torme, Al Grey, Jimmie Rowles, Steve Turre, and Dardanelle Hadley (aka Dardanelle Breckenridge, née Marcia Marie Mullen; 1917–1997) with Vivian Lord (born 1929; mother of Tom and Chris Lord-Alge).

In 1992, Stash launched its mail-order division.  Bernard (Bernie) Brightman (1921–2003) was the founder and ran it until it closed. In 1986, Stash announced a discovery of a tape featuring Charlie Parker in a hotel with sidemen from the 1943 Earl Hines band. In 1994, Stash's Daybreak label released a recording of President Bill Clinton playing the saxophone with a six-piece jazz combo on a visit to Prague.

Jass Records

Under the imprint of Jass Records, Stash released, among other things, themed compilations, including collections relating to women in jazz.  Several albums in particular, including Forty Years of Women in Jazz (1989), have received wide acclaim from historians, critics, and record collectors.

Vintage Jazz Classics
VJC releases include several radio broadcast transcriptions

Natasha Imports
Natasha Imports released several recordings from the 1940s and 1950s by artists that included Stan Kenton, Frank Sinatra (when he was young), and Dizzy Gillespie.

Viper's Nest Records
Viper's Nest Records released a few collections with comical and/or taboo titles relating to weed or sex, namely When Hemp Was Hip and The Copulatin' Collection.

Legacy of Bernie Brightman

As stated in an obituary written by Will Friedwald, a jazz critic who had worked for Stash:

Labels associated with Stash and affiliated entities

Personnel

External links

References 

Record labels established in 1975
Jazz record labels
American record labels
Defunct record labels of the United States
1975 establishments in New York City